The Medway Tunnel is a tunnel under the River Medway linking Strood with Chatham in Kent, England.  It forms part of the A289 Medway Towns Northern Relief Road. The Medway Tunnel is the first immersed tube tunnel to be built in England and only the second of this type in the UK, the other at Conwy, North Wales.

History

Proposal and construction 
The Rochester Bridge had been the lowest river crossing of the River Medway for centuries, and despite expansion in the 1970s was very congested. In the late 1980s, the Medway Tunnel was proposed downstream of the Bridge to relieve congestion on the bridge, to allow greater access to the Medway Towns and assist with redevelopment of Chatham Dockyard. 

The Medway Tunnel Bill - promoted by the Rochester Bridge Trust - was submitted to Parliament in 1988. In 1990 the Medway Tunnel Act was passed granting the Rochester Bridge Trust the power to build and own the tunnel.

The £80m project was carried out by an HBM Civil Engineering / Tarmac Construction joint venture, and started in May 1992. The tunnel itself was constructed in three distinct sections.

As part of the construction project, 800m of new dual carriageway and a new junction was built to connect the new tunnel to the existing road network. Separate from the project, various bypasses and link roads were constructed to provide access to the local area - the A289 Medway Northern Relief Road.

The Medway Tunnel was officially opened by the Princess Royal on 12 June 1996. In 1996, it won an award from the UK's Concrete Society.

Running costs
In 2008 negotiations were completed by Medway Council which purchased the freehold of the tunnel from the Trust for £1 with a £3.6m contribution on future costs.

Operation
The tunnel is used by around 40,000 vehicles per day.

Cyclists are currently not allowed to travel through the tunnel which is not part of the local cycle network.

References

External links

Road tunnels in England
Transport in Medway
Tunnels completed in 1996
Immersed tube tunnels in the United Kingdom

 Rochester Bridge Trust